Omega Persei (ω Persei) is a solitary, orange-hued star in the northern constellation of Perseus.  The star is faintly visible to the naked eye with an apparent visual magnitude of +4.6. Based upon an annual parallax shift of 11.32 mas as seen from the Earth, the star is about 288 light years from the Sun.

ω Persei has the traditional name Gorgonea Quarta , being the fourth member of the quartet called the Gorgonea in reference to the Gorgons from the legend of Perseus.

This is an evolved K-type giant star with a stellar classification of K0 III. It is a red clump star that is generating energy via helium fusion at its core. At the estimated age of 1.65 billion years, Omega Persei has double times the mass of the Sun and has expanded to about 19 times the Sun's radius. It is radiating 144.5 times the Sun's luminosity from its photosphere at an effective temperature of 4,586 K.

References

K-type giants
Horizontal-branch stars
Persei, Omega
Perseus (constellation)
BD+39 0742
Persei, 28
019656
014817
0947